O'Loughlin Gaels is a Gaelic Athletic Association club situated in the St. John’s parish of Kilkenny city, County Kilkenny, Ireland.

History 
The club was founded in 1969, replacing the St. John’s Hurling Club that started back in 1887.

O'Loughlin Gaels are one of the most successful Kilkenny clubs of the new millennium, winning county titles in 2001 and 2003.

In 2003, they went on to claim their first Leinster senior title. In January 2011, they claimed their second Leinster title after a 0-14 to 1-8 win against Oulart-the-Ballagh in the final.  
 
The club was named AIB Club of the Year in 1983.

Honours
All-Ireland Senior Club Hurling Championships: 0
Leinster Senior Club Hurling Championships: 2
 2003, 2010
Kilkenny Senior Hurling Championships: 4
 2001, 2002, 2010, 2016
 Kilkenny Intermediate Hurling Championships: 2
 1978, 1996
 Kilkenny Junior Hurling Championships: 2
 1975, 1995
 Kilkenny Minor Hurling Championships 6
 1972, 1978, 1980, 2004, 2014, 2017
 Kilkenny Under-21 Hurling Championships 3
 1976, 1981, 2015,2019

Notable hurlers

 Andy Comerford
 Martin Comerford
 Paddy Deegan
 Mark Kelly (hurler)
 Seán Dowling
 Gary Delaney
 Paul Kelly, Tipperary
 Alan Kennedy
 James Lenihan

References

External links
 O'Loughlin Gaels on the official GAA website

Gaelic games clubs in County Kilkenny
Hurling clubs in County Kilkenny